KTUG (105.1 FM, "Jack FM 105.1") is a radio station broadcasting an adult hits music format. Licensed to Hudson, Wyoming, United States, the station is currently owned by Morcom Broadcasting, LLC and features programming from Fox News Radio.

References

External links

TUG
Fremont County, Wyoming
Radio stations established in 2009
2009 establishments in Wyoming
Jack FM stations
Adult hits radio stations in the United States